Parkton may refer to a location in the United States:

Parkton, Maryland
Parkton, Minnesota
Parkton, North Carolina